Gemmobacter fontiphilus is a Gram-negative, rod-shaped, non-spore-forming, facultatively anaerobic and non-motile bacterium from the genus of Gemmobacter which has been isolated from a freshwater spring from Taiwan.

References

External links
Type strain of Gemmobacter fontiphilus at BacDive -  the Bacterial Diversity Metadatabase

Rhodobacteraceae
Bacteria described in 2013